North Bank Park is an  park in downtown Columbus, Ohio, United States. The park includes a work of art, Flowing Kiss, installed in 2013.

History
Ground broke on July 24, 2003, and the park was dedicated on July 16, 2005. Construction cost approximately $15 million.

See also

 List of parks in Columbus, Ohio

References

External links
 
 
 Scioto Mile page

2005 establishments in Ohio
Downtown Columbus, Ohio
Parks in Columbus, Ohio
Protected areas established in 2005